1935–36 was the twenty-eighth occasion on which the Lancashire Cup completion had been held.
Salford won the trophy by beating Wigan by 15–7.
The match was played at Wilderspool, Warrington, now in the County Palatine of Chester but (historically in the county of Lancashire. The attendance was 16,500 and receipts were £950.
This was the second of the three consecutive Lancashire Cup finals in which Salford would beat Wigan.

Background 
The number of teams entering this year's competition was increased by one with the addition of Streatham & Mitcham (hardly a Lancashire club, but useful to make the numbers up). This brought the number up to 14 and the same fixture format was retained. There was now no need for a bye in the first round, but  there was still a "blank" or "dummy" fixture. The bye in the second round remained.

Competition and results

Round 1  
Involved  7 matches (with one "blank" fixture) and 14 clubs

Round 1 – replays  
Involved 1 match

Round 2 – quarterfinals  
Involved 3 matches (with one bye) and 7 clubs

Round 2 – quarterfinals – first replays  
Involved 1 match

div>

Round 3 – semifinals 
Involved 2 matches and 4 clubs

Final

Teams and scorers 

Scoring - Try = three (3) points - Goal = two (2) points - Drop goal = two (2) points

The road to success

Notes and comments 

1 * First Lancashire Cup match by new London club Streatham & Mitcham

2 *  Wilderspool was the home ground of Warrington from 1883 to the end of the 2003 Summer season when they moved into the new purpose built Halliwell Jones Stadium. Wilderspool remained as a sports/Ruugby League ground and is/was used by Woolston Rovers/Warrington Wizards junior club. 
The ground had a final capacity of 9,000 although the record attendance was set in a Challenge cup third round match on 13 March 1948 when 34,304 spectators saw Warrington lose to Wigan 10–13.

See also 
1935–36 Northern Rugby Football League season
Rugby league county cups

References

External links
Saints Heritage Society
1896–97 Northern Rugby Football Union season at wigan.rlfans.com
Hull&Proud Fixtures & Results 1896/1897
Widnes Vikings - One team, one passion Season In Review - 1896-97
The Northern Union at warringtonwolves.org

1935 in English rugby league
RFL Lancashire Cup